Seventeen was an Indonesian pop rock band, formed in 1999 in Yogyakarta.

Seventeen was performing in a tent at Tanjung Lesung resort on 22 December 2018 when the 2018 Sunda Strait tsunami struck the stage from behind. Bani, Herman, Andi, a crew member, and their on-road manager were killed. Ifan, the only surviving member, announced his solo career.

History
The band was formed by Yudhi Rus Harjanto, Herman Sikumbang, Zulianto "Zozo" Angga, and Windu Andi Darmawan who attended a private high school in Yogyakarta. With a serious desire to form a band, they asked M. Awal "Bani" Purbani, Yudhi's cousin, to join the band. Seventeen was officially formed on January 17, 1999. The band's name, "Seventeen", was chosen because all of the band members were 17 years old. One year later, Yohan "Doni" Saputro joined the band to fill the vocalist position.

Their debut album, Bintang Terpilih ("Selected Stars") was released on July 17, 2003, through Universal Music Indonesia. They asked Indonesian MTV VJ at the time, Arie Untung, to duet on their song "Jibaku". This album managed to achieve sales figures of up to 75,000 copies and some of its songs were used for soap opera soundtracks. Shortly after the album's release, their label closed its local division. For the next two years, they did not have a label contract. When the Universal Music local division was reopened, Seventeen immediately returned to signing a contract. They later released their second album, Sweet Seventeen in 2005 with the single "Jika Kau Percaya" ("If You Believe").

In 2008, vocalist Doni, drummer Andi, and guitarist Zozo left the band. The remaining band members were anxious to find a replacement of Doni for the crucial vocalist position. After going through the audition process, they got Ifan as their new vocalist. The difference in vocal characteristics between Doni and Ifan made a change in Seventeen's genre. Seventeen's third album, Lelaki Hebat ("Great Man"), was released in 2008 with a drastic change from rock to pop. For their third album, Seventeen released it in the Glodok electronic goods shopping center which has been known as a place for music pirates. After the release of their third album, Andi rejoined as a drummer after previously leaving because he focused on his work as a bank employee. In 2011, the band released their fourth album, Dunia yang Indah ("The Beautiful World"), with a hit single "Jaga Slalu Hatimu" ("Always Keep Your Heart").

In 2013, due to differences in music vision, guitarist Yudhi chose to leave the band when the fifth album Sang Juara ("The Champion") was going to be released. The album contains two singles, titled "Sang Juara" and "Sumpah Ku Mencintaimu" ("I Swear I Love You").

Three years later, on 31 March 2016, they released their sixth album Pantang Mundur ("Persistent"). In this album, they worked with music directors for the first time. The album contains 11 tracks including four singles "Cinta Jangan Sembunyi" ("Love Don't Hide"), "Bukan Main Main" ("Not Kidding"), "Aku Gila" (I'm Crazy"), "Menunggu Kamu" ("Waiting for You") and "Kemarin" ("Yesterday").

In 2018, they released a new single titled "Jangan Dulu Pergi" ("Don't Go Away"), written for the vocalist Ifan's deceased father. Its music video was released on 10 June 2018. It was the last work by the band before it disbanded.

Sunda Strait tsunami

Seventeen was performing at PLN Family Gathering in Tanjung Lesung, Pandeglang, Banten, when an eruption from Anak Krakatau caused a tsunami that abruptly struck the stage from behind. All the members were swept away by the tsunami. Bassist Bani and road manager Oki Wijaya were declared dead at the scene. The body of guitarist Herman was found several hours after being announced as missing. The body of drummer Andi was found one day after being announced as missing. Crew  member Rukmana “Ujang” Rustam and vocalist Ifan's wife, actress and TV personality Dylan Sahara, were also killed in the tsunami.

Ifan survived the tsunami as the only remaining member of Seventeen. He later announced that the band is now disbanded, and he would continue as a solo artist. Despite being disbanded, the band’s name is still carried by Ivan in his solo career. On 13 November 2022, Ivan announced that although the band no longer exists, he will continue to use the band name in honor of the deceased members, naming them as eternal members retaining the posts they had while still alive. Ivan took the move to preserve the Seventeen name in the Indonesian music industry, announcing that will not form a new band or join any band, in honor of his former band members.

Documentary film 
In 2019, Mahakarya Pictures announced with Mahaka Radio Integra that they were working on documentary film of Seventeen. The film was announced in October 2019 as Kemarin (Yesterday). The film was released on December 3, 2020, after facing several delays to complete the film's development and due to the COVID-19 pandemic, closing most of its theater across Indonesia.

Former members 
 Windu Andi Darmawan – drums (1999–2018; his death)
 M. Awal "Bani" Purbani – bass guitar (1999–2018; his death)
 Herman Sikumbang – guitar (1999–2018; his death)
 Riefian "Ifan" Fajarsyah – vocals (2008–2018)
 Zulianto Zulkifli "Zozo" Angga – guitar (1999–2008)
 Yudhi Rus Harjanto – guitar (1999–2012)
 Yohan "Doni" Saputro – vocals, guitar (2000–2007)

Timeline

Discography

Studio albums
 Bintang Terpilih (2003)
 Sweet Seventeen (2005)
 Lelaki Hebat (2008)
 Dunia Yang Indah (2011)
 Sang Juara (2013)
 Pantang Mundur (2016)

Singles
 "Jibaku" (featuring Arie Untung) (2003)
 "Jika Kau Percaya" (2005)
 "Selalu Mengalah" (2008)
 "Untuk Mencintaimu" (2008)
 "Lelaki Hebat" (2008)
 "Jalan Terbaik" (2008)
 "Jaga Slalu Hatimu" (2011)
 "Hal Terindah" (2011)
 "Sang Juara" (2013)
 "Sumpah Ku Mencintaimu" (2013)
 "Cinta Jangan Sembunyi" (2016)
 "Bukan Main Main" (2016)
 "Aku Gila" (2016)
 "Menunggu Kamu" (2016)
 "Kemarin" (2016)
 "Jangan Dulu Pergi" (2018)

References

External links
 Seventeen on GP Records (in Indonesian)

Indonesian alternative rock groups
Musical groups established in 1999
Musical groups disestablished in 2018
1999 establishments in Indonesia
2018 disestablishments in Indonesia